Afgekia is a small genus of large perennial climbing shrubs native to Thailand in Asia, belonging to the family Fabaceae. They are reminiscent of the related genus Wisteria.

Description
The mature stems are brown. The leaves are evergreen and generally have 8–16 paired leaflets plus a terminal leaflet. Nine of the stamens are fused together, the other is free; all curve upwards at the apex.

Taxonomy

The genus Afgekia was established by William Grant Craib in 1927, initially with one species, Afgekia sericea. The genus name commemorates Arthur Francis George Kerr, being formed from his initials. Kerr was an Irish physician and pioneering botanist in Thailand in the early twentieth century. The type specimen of Afgekia sericea was collected by Kerr's Thai associate Anuwat.

A 2019 molecular phylogenetic study showed that one of the species then placed in Afgekia (A. filipes, now Padbruggea filipes) did not belong in the genus, but that the remaining two species formed a well separated clade, sister to Kanburia, in turn forming a larger clade with Callerya, Serawaia and Whitfordiodendron. Morphological characters that distinguish Afgekia from other genera include two rather than one pair of callosities on the standard petal and the longest stipules and floral bracts in the tribe Wisterieae.

Species
, Plants of the World Online accepted two species:
 Afgekia mahidoliae 
 Afgekia sericea

References

External links 
 Flora of Thailand (photo) 
 Afgekia mahidolae Burtt et Chermsir 

Wisterieae
Fabaceae genera
Taxa named by William Grant Craib